Thomas Murray (1770 – August 26, 1823) was a member of the United States House of Representatives from Pennsylvania.

Thomas Murray was born near Pott's Grove, Pennsylvania. He was a member of the Pennsylvania House of Representatives beginning in 1813. Murray was elected as a Republican to the Seventeenth Congress to fill the vacancy caused by the resignation of William Cox Ellis. He declined to be a candidate for renomination in 1822. He died in East Chillisquaque Township, Pennsylvania, and was buried in Chillisquaque Cemetery, near Potts Grove.

He was a cousin of John Murray (1768-1834), who also served as a Congressman from Pennsylvania.

Sources

The Political Graveyard

Members of the Pennsylvania House of Representatives
1770 births
1823 deaths
Democratic-Republican Party members of the United States House of Representatives from Pennsylvania